Lev Vladimirovich Korolyov (born 3 June 1986) is a former Russian professional football player.

Club career
He played in the Russian Football National League for FC Zhemchuzhina-Sochi and FC Khimki in 2010.

External links
 
 

1986 births
Sportspeople from Sochi
Living people
Russian footballers
Association football midfielders
FC Zhemchuzhina Sochi players
FC Khimki players
FC Metallurg Lipetsk players
FC Chernomorets Novorossiysk players